The 2013 Tour de France King of the Mountains is Nairo Quintana. He won the mountains classification of the 2013 Tour de France which is in place to decide the best climber of the tour. The race featured 5 Hors catégorie climbs, 6 Category-one climbs, 12 Category-two climbs, 16 Category-three climbs, and 17 Category-four climbs. That means the 2013 Tour de France included 28 mountain climbs or altitude finishes ranked Category-two, Category-one or Hors catégorie compared to 25 in 2012, 23 in 2011 and 25 in 2010. 4 of these climbs are in Corsica, 2 in the Massif Central, 7 in the Pyrenees and 15 in the Alps.
Notable climbs in this year's tour include Col de Pailheres, Col de la Madeleine, Annecy-Semnoz, Mont Ventoux and Alpe d'Huez (twice).

Point distribution

Points awarded are doubled for the final climbs on stages 8, 15, 18 and 20.

Overall classification
Final Mountains Classification top 20 riders with points by stage:

Final Mountains Classification top 6 riders with points by category:

* denotes climbs were also stage finishes and therefore points awarded were doubled.

Top 6 riders' results on the HC and 1st category climbs
The following table shows the mountains classification's top six riders' results on the 15 most difficult climbs of the 2013 Tour de France.

* denotes climbs were also stage finishes and therefore points awarded were doubled.

How the polka-dot jersey was won
Pierre Rolland scored points on more climbs than any other rider; on a total of 18 climbs, compared to the King of the Mountains Nairo Quintana, who scored points on only 6 climbs. However, the climbs that Quintana scored points on included all three of the Hors Category climbs that were at stage finishes – the climbs that offered the most points. Of the climbs the riders placed in the points for, Quintana averaged 24.5 points per climb, compared to Rolland who averaged just 6.6 points. In total, Quintana won 97% of his points on Hors Category climbs, Chris Froome 79%, Rodriguez 92%, Riblon 88% and Nieve 86%, compared to Rolland who only won 48% of his points on HC climbs.

Stage by stage

Stage 1
In the first stage, only one climb was categorized: the Cote de Sotta, of fourth category. The details and result of the climb on this stage are as follows:

Cote de Sotta – 45.5 km (Category 4)
This climb is 1.1 km at an average gradient of 5.9%.

Juan José Lobato was awarded the polka dot jersey after the stage.

Stage 2

Juan José Lobato started the stage wearing the polka dot jersey. The details and results of the climbs on this stage are as follows:

Col de Bellagranajo – 70 km (Category 3)
This climb is 6.6 km at an average gradient of 4.6%.

Cote de la Serra – 85.0 km (Category 3)
This climb is 5.2 km at an average gradient of 6.9%.

Col de Vizzavona (1,163 m) – 95.5 km (Category 2)
This climb is 4.6 km at an average gradient of 6.5%.

Cote du Salario – 144.0 km (Category 3)
This climb is 1.9 km at an average gradient of 8.9%.

Blel Kadri and Pierre Rolland finished the stage tied on 5 points in the mountain classification. But, the polka dot jersey was awarded to Pierre Rolland because he had the most first-place finishes on the hardest climbs.
Blel Kadri won the combativity award for the stage.

Stage 3

Stage 3 started with Pierre Rolland in the polka dot jersey. The details and results of the climbs on this stage are as follows:

Col de san Bastino – 12.0 km (Category 4)
This climb is 3.4 km at an average gradient of 4.6%.

Cote de san Martino – 58.0 km (Category 3)
This climb is 7.5 km at an average gradient of 5.4%.

Cote de Porto – 75.0 km (Category 3)
This climb is 2 km at an average gradient of 6.4%.

Col de Marsolino (443 m) – 132.0 km (Category 2)
This climb is 3.3 km at an average gradient of 8.1%.

Pierre Rolland increased his overall lead in the King of the Mountains classification.
Simon Clarke won the combativity award for the stage.

Stage 4
Team time trial – no climbs.

Stage 5
The details and results of the climbs on this stage are as follows:

Cote de Chateauneuf-Grasse – 22 km (Category 3)
This climb is 1.4 km at an average gradient of 8.4%.

Col de l'Ange – 93 km (Category 4)
This climb is 1.66 km at an average gradient of 4.1%.

Cote de la Roquebrussanne – 154 km (Category 4)
This climb is 3.5 km at an average gradient of 4.2%.

Cote des Bastides – 198 km (Category 4)
This climb is 5.7 km at an average gradient of 3.1%.

In addition to winning 4 points and moving up to 4th place in the mountains classification, Thomas De Gendt won the combativity award for the stage. Pierre Rolland maintained a 5-point lead in the mountains classification and kept the polka dot jersey.

Stage 6

The details and results of the climbs on this stage are as follows:

Col de la Vayede – 68 km (Category 4)
This climb is 0.7 km at an average gradient of 7%.

This was Kanstantsin Sivtsov's first point in the mountains classification, so the top of the leader-board stayed the same with Pierre Rolland retaining the polka dot jersey.

Stage 7

The details and results of the climbs on this stage are as follows:

Col des Treize Vents (600 m) – 80 km (Category 3)
This climb is 6.9 km at an average gradient of 5.6%.

Col de la Croix de Mounis (809 m) – 94.5 km (Category 2)
This climb is 6.7 km at an average gradient of 6.5%.

Cote de la Quintaine (809 m) – 149 km (Category 3)
This climb is 6.5 km at an average gradient of 4%.

Cote de Teillet – 171 km (Category 4)
This climb is 2.6 km at an average gradient of 5%.

Finishing first in the first and second climbs of the stage meant Blel Kadri became the new leader in the mountains category, just one point ahead of previous leader Pierre Rolland.

Stage 8 – Col de Pailheres
Stage 8 is the first "very difficult stage" of the 2013 Tour de France. The details and results of the climbs on this stage are as follows:

Cote de Saint-Ferreol (374 m) – 26.5 km (Category 4)
This climb is 2.2 km at an average gradient of 5.4%.

Col de Pailheres (2001 m) – 166 km (Hors catégorie)
This climb is 15.3 km at an average gradient of 8% with long sections at 9-10%. The summit is the highest point on the entire route of this year's Tour. The leader over the summit won the Souvenir Henri Desgrange.

Ax 3 Domaines (1350 m) – 193.5 km (Category 1)
This climb is 7.8 km at an average gradient of 8.2%. Points awarded are doubled on this climb.

The polka dot jersey of Blel Kadri was dropped by the peloton early on the climb to the Col de Pailheres. Nairo Quintana attacked the peloton to chase down and pass breakaway rider Christophe Riblon and win the first Hors catégorie climb of the 2013 Tour de France, with Pierre Rolland finishing less than a minute behind him in an attempt to reclaim the polka dot jersey. Nairo Quintana also won the combativity award for the stage. The final climb saw Chris Froome make his first push for the general classification. He was first to the summit of the climb, followed by teammate Richie Porte.

Stage 9

While Chris Froome led the mountains classification going into this stage, the polka dot jersey was worn by Pierre Rolland because Chris Froome also had the yellow jersey. The details and results of the climbs on this stage are as follows:

Col de Portet d'Aspet (1069 m) – 28.5 km (Category 2)
This climb is 5.4 km at an average gradient of 7%.

Col de Menté (1349 m) – 44 km (Category 1)
This climb is 7 km at an average gradient of 8.1%.

Col de Peyresourde (1569 m) – 87 km (Category 1)
This climb is 13.1 km at an average gradient of 7.1%.

Col de Val Louron-Azet (1580 m) – 107.5 km (Category 1)

This climb is 7.4 km at an average gradient of 8.3%.

La Hourquette d'Ancizan (1564 m) – 135 km (Category 1)
This climb is 9.9 km at an average gradient of 7.5%.

With Richard Virenque and Laurent Jalabert for inspiration, Pierre Rolland won 18 points on an "epic" stage 9 to top the mountains classification outright. Dan Martin picked up 13 points on the stage, including a maximum 10 points on the final climb en route to his stage victory.

Stage 10
The details and results of the climb on this stage are as follows:

Cote de Dinan – 142 km (Category 4)
This climb is 1 km at an average gradient of 4.2%.

Stage 11
Individual time trial – no climbs.

Stage 12
Flat stage – no climbs.

Stage 13
The details and results of the climbs on this stage are as follows:

Cote de Crotz – 77.5 km (Category 4)
This climb is 1.2 km at an average gradient of 4%.

Stage 14
The details and results of the climbs on this stage are as follows:

Cote de Marcigny – 66.5 km (Category 4)
This climb is 6.9 km at an average gradient of 5.6%.

Côte de la Croix Couverte – 98.5 km (Category 4)
This climb is 6.9 km at an average gradient of 5.6%.

Côte de Thizy-les-Bourgs – 113 km (Category 3)
This climb is 6.9 km at an average gradient of 5.6%.

Col du Pilon (727 m) – 126.5 km (Category 3)
This climb is 6.9 km at an average gradient of 5.6%.

Côte de Lozanne – 161 km (Category 4)
This climb is 6.9 km at an average gradient of 5.6%.

Côte de la Duchère – 176 km (Category 4)
This climb is 6.9 km at an average gradient of 5.6%.

Côte de la Croix Rousse – 181.5 km (Category 4)
This climb is 6.9 km at an average gradient of 5.6%.

Stage 15 – Mont Ventoux
The details and results of the climbs on this stage are as follows:

Cote d'Eyzin (436 m) – 20.5 km (Category 4)

Cote de Primarette (459 m) – 26.5 km (Category 4)

Cote de Lens-Lestang (424 m) – 44.5 km (Category 4)

Cote de Bourdeaux (651 m) – 143 km (Category 3)

Mont Ventoux (1912 m) – 242 km (Hors catégorie)
This climb is 20.8 km at an average gradient of 7.5%. Point awarded will be double for this climb.

Stage 16
While Chris Froome led the mountains classification going into this stage, the polka dot jersey was worn by 3rd placed Mikel Nieve because Chris Froome also had the yellow jersey and 2nd placed Nairo Quintana held the white jersey. The details and results of the climbs on this stage are as follows:

Côte de la Montagne de Bluye – 17.5 km (Category 3)
This climb is 5.7 km at an average gradient of 5.6%.

Col de Macuègne (1 068 m) – 48 km (Category 2)
This climb is 7.6 km at an average gradient of 5.2%.

Col de Manse (1 268 m) – 156.5 km (Category 2)
This climb is 9.5 km at an average gradient of 5.2%.

Stage 17
While Chris Froome led the mountains classification going into this stage, the polka dot jersey was worn by 3rd placed Mikel Nieve because Chris Froome also had the yellow jersey and 2nd placed Nairo Quintana held the white jersey. This stage is the second Individual time trial and features two category 2 climbs. The details and results of the climbs on this stage are as follows:

Côte de Puy-Sanières – 6.5 km (Category 2)
This climb is 6.4 km at an average gradient of 6%.

 Côte de Réallon – 20 km (Category 2)
This climb is 6.9 km at an average gradient of 6.3%.

Stage 18 – Alpe d'Huez

While Chris Froome led the mountains classification going into this stage, the polka dot jersey was worn by 3rd placed Mikel Nieve because Chris Froome also had the yellow jersey and 2nd placed Nairo Quintana held the white jersey.

Col de Manse (1268 m) – 13 km (Category 2)
This climb is 6.6 km at an average gradient of 6.2%.

Rampe du Motty (982 m) – 45 km (Category 3)
This climb is 2.4 km at an average gradient of 8%.

Col d'Ornon (1371 m) – 95 km (Category 2)
This climb is 5.1 km at an average gradient of 6.7%.

Alpe-d'Huez 1 (1765 m) – 122.5 km (Hors catégorie)
This climb is 12.3 km at an average gradient of 8.4%.

Col de Sarenne (1999 m) – 131.5 km (Category 2)
This climb is 3 km at an average gradient of 7.8%.

Alpe-d'Huez 2 (1850 m) – 172.5 km (Hors catégorie)
This climb is 13.8 km at an average gradient of 8.1%. Points for this climb are doubled because it is a stage finish on a climb above category 2.

Stage 19 – Col du Glandon and Col de la Madeleine

While Chris Froome led the mountains classification going into this stage, the polka dot jersey was worn by 3rd placed Christophe Riblon because Chris Froome also had the yellow jersey and 2nd placed Nairo Quintana held the white jersey.

Col du Glandon (1924 m) – 33.5 km (Hors catégorie)
This climb is 21.6 km at an average gradient of 5.1%.

Col de la Madeleine (2000 m) – 83.5 km (Hors catégorie)
This climb is 19.2 km at an average gradient of 7.9%.

Col de Tamié (907 m) – 143 km (Category 2)
This climb is 8.6 km at an average gradient of 6.2%.

Col de l'Épine – 165 km (Category 1)
This climb is 6.1 km at an average gradient of 7.3%.

Col de la Croix Fry (1477 m) – 191.5 km (Category 1)
This climb is 11.3 km at an average gradient of 7%.

Stage 20 – Annecy–Semnoz
While Chris Froome led the mountains classification going into this stage, the polka dot jersey was worn by 2nd placed Pierre Rolland because Chris Froome also had the yellow jersey.

Côte du Puget (796 m) – 12.5 km (Category 2)
This climb is 5.4 km at an average gradient of 5.9%.

Col de Leschaux (944 m) – 17.5 km (Category 3)
This climb is 3.6 km at an average gradient of 6.1%.

Côte d'Aillon-le-Vieux (929 m) – 43 km (Category 3)
This climb is 6 km at an average gradient of 4%.

Col des Prés (1142 m) – 51 km (Category 3)
This climb is 3.4 km at an average gradient of 6.9%.

Mont Revard (1463 m) – 78.5 km (Category 1)
This climb is 15.9 km at an average gradient of 5.6%.

Annecy-Semnoz (1655 m) – 125 km (Hors catégorie)
This climb is 10.7 km at an average gradient of 8.5%. Points for this climb are doubled because it is also the stage finish.

As well as winning the stage and the final climb, Nairo Quintana also became the 2013 King of the Mountains.

Stage 21
The 2013 Tour de France King of the Mountains Niaro Quintana wore the polka-dot jersey on the final stage of the 100th tour.

Côte de Saint-Rémy-lès-Chevreuse – 29.5 km (Category 4)
This climb is 1 km at an average gradient of 6.9%.

Côte de Châteaufort (Stèle Jacques Anquetil) – 33.5 km (Category 4)
This climb is 0.9 km at an average gradient of 4.7%.

References

External links
 Official classifications
 Race regulations

2013 Tour de France
Tour de France classifications and awards